Rustic is a neighbourhood in the city of Toronto, Ontario, Canada. It is located in the southwest of the North York district. Its approximate borders are Lawrence Avenue to the south, Jane Street to the west, Highway 401 to the north, and Culford Road to the east.

Demographics
Major ethnic populations (2016):
 39.6% White; (22.6% Italian, 8.1% Portuguese)
 34.8% Black; 10.4% Jamaican, 10.1% Somali
 7.4% Latin American (of any race)
 4.3% South Asian
 4.1% Filipino

References

Neighbourhoods in Toronto